2006–07 Hong Kong Second Division League was the 93rd season of Hong Kong Second Division League.

The top 2 teams in 2005–06 season, HKFC and Tai Po have promoted to First Division. However, the bottom 2 teams in First Division are retained by HKFA in the top division. Therefore, the number of teams competing in the Second Division in 2006–07 is reduced from 13 to 11 teams. The 2 teams promoted from Third Division were Shek Kip Mei and Yau Tsim Mong.

League table

Results

Top goalscorers

Featured matches 
 Highest Scoring Match:

 Biggest Goal Difference Match:

References

Hong Kong Second Division League seasons
Hong Kong
2